William Virts House, also known as the Uriah Beans House, is a historic home located near Waterford, Loudoun County, Virginia. It is a -story, three bay, Federal-style stone dwelling that took this form about 1813.  It has a side gable roof and sits on a banked basement built about 1798.  Also on the property are the contributing -story vernacular stone spring house built about 1813 and frame shed built about 1840.

It was listed on the National Register of Historic Places in 2011.

References

Houses on the National Register of Historic Places in Virginia
Federal architecture in Virginia
Houses completed in 1798
Houses in Loudoun County, Virginia
National Register of Historic Places in Loudoun County, Virginia